In economics, returns to scale describe what happens to long-run returns as the scale of production increases, when all input levels including physical capital usage are variable (able to be set by the firm). The concept of returns to scale arises in the context of a firm's production function.  It explains the long-run linkage of the rate of increase in output (production) relative to associated increases in the inputs (factors of production). In the long run, all factors of production are variable and subject to change in response to a given increase in production scale. While economies of scale show the effect of an increased output level on unit costs, returns to scale focus only on the relation between input and output quantities.

There are three possible types of returns to scale: increasing returns to scale, constant returns to scale, and diminishing (or decreasing) returns to scale.
If output increases by the same proportional change as all inputs change then there are constant returns to scale (CRS). If output increases by less than the proportional change in all inputs, there are decreasing returns to scale (DRS). If output increases by more than the proportional change in all inputs, there are increasing returns to scale (IRS). A firm's production function could exhibit different types of returns to scale in different ranges of output.  Typically, there could be increasing returns at relatively low output levels, decreasing returns at relatively high output levels, and constant returns at some range of output levels between those extremes.

In mainstream microeconomics, the returns to scale faced by a firm are purely technologically imposed and are not influenced by economic decisions or by market conditions (i.e., conclusions about returns to scale are derived from the specific mathematical structure of the production function in isolation).

Example

When the usages of all inputs increase by a factor of 2, new values for output will be:

 Twice the previous output if there are constant returns to scale (CRS)
 Less than twice the previous output if there are decreasing returns to scale (DRS)
 More than twice the previous output if there are increasing returns to scale (IRS)

Assuming that the factor costs are constant (that is, that the firm is a perfect competitor in all input markets) and the production function is homothetic, a firm experiencing constant returns will have constant long-run average costs, a firm experiencing decreasing returns will have increasing long-run average costs, and a firm experiencing increasing returns will have decreasing long-run average costs.  However, this relationship breaks down if the firm does not face perfectly competitive factor markets (i.e., in this context, the price one pays for a good does depend on the amount purchased). For example, if there are increasing returns to scale in some range of output levels, but the firm is so big in one or more input markets that increasing its purchases of an input drives up the input's per-unit cost, then the firm could have diseconomies of scale in that range of output levels. Conversely, if the firm is able to get bulk discounts of an input, then it could have economies of scale in some range of output levels even if it has decreasing returns in production in that output range.

Formal definitions

Formally, a production function  is defined to have:
Constant returns to scale if (for any constant a  greater than 0)  (Function F is homogeneous of degree 1)
Decreasing returns to scale if (for any constant a greater than 1) 
Increasing returns to scale if (for any constant a greater than 1) 
where K and L are factors of production—capital and labor, respectively.

In a more general set-up, for a multi-input-multi-output production processes, one may assume technology can be represented via some technology set, call it , which must satisfy some regularity conditions of production theory.  In this case, the property of constant returns to scale is equivalent to saying that technology set  is a cone, i.e., satisfies the property .  In turn, if there is a production function that will describe the technology set  it will have to be homogeneous of degree 1.

Formal example

The Cobb–Douglas functional form has constant returns to scale when the sum of the exponents is 1.
In that case the function is:

Thus

Here as input usages all scale by the multiplicative factor a, output also scales by a and so there are constant returns to scale.

But if the Cobb–Douglas production function has its general form

See also

Diseconomies of scale and Economies of scale
Economies of agglomeration
Economies of scope
Experience curve effects
Ideal firm size
Homogeneous function
Mohring effect
Moore's law

References

Further reading
 Susanto Basu (2008). "Returns to scale measurement," The New Palgrave Dictionary of Economics, 2nd Edition. Abstract.
 James M. Buchanan and Yong J. Yoon, ed. (1994) The Return to Increasing Returns. U.Mich. Press. Chapter-preview links.
 John Eatwell (1987). "Returns to scale," The New Palgrave: A Dictionary of Economics, v. 4, pp. 165–66.
 Färe, R., S. Grosskopf and C.A.K. Lovell (1986), “Scale economies and duality” Zeitschrift für Nationalökonomie 46:2, pp. 175–182.
 Hanoch, G. (1975) “The elasticity of scale and the shape of average costs,” American Economic Review 65, pp. 492–497.
 Panzar, J.C. and R.D. Willig (1977) “Economies of scale in multi-output production, Quarterly Journal of Economics 91, 481-493.
 Joaquim Silvestre (1987). "Economies and diseconomies of scale," The New Palgrave: A Dictionary of Economics, v. 2, pp. 80–84.
 Spirros Vassilakis (1987). "Increasing returns to scale,"  The New Palgrave: A Dictionary of Economics, v. 2, pp. 761–64.
 
 Zelenyuk V. (2014) “Scale efficiency and homotheticity: equivalence of primal and dual measures” Journal of Productivity Analysis 42:1,  pp 15-24.

External links
 Economies of Scale and Returns to Scale
 Video Lecture on Returns to Scale in Macroeconomics

Production economics